Tatsumi is a Japanese name. It may refer to:

People

Surname
Daiyū Tatsumi (born 1940), Japanese former sumo wrestler
Juri Tatsumi (born 1979), Japanese synchronised swimmer
Naofumi Tatsumi (1845–1907), Japanese general of the Imperial Army
Noriko Tatsumi (born 1947), Japanese erotic actress
Shingo Tatsumi (born 1987), Japanese baseball player
Takayuki Tatsumi (born 1955), Japanese literature professor
Yoshihiro Tatsumi (1935–2015 ), Japanese manga artist
Yoshika Tatsumi (born 1982), birthname of Japanese runner Yoshika Arai
Yuiko Tatsumi (born 1987), Japanese voice actress

Given name
Tatsumi Fujinami (born 1953), Japanese professional wrestler
Tatsumi Hijikata (1928–1986), Japanese choreographer
Tatsumi Iida (born 1985), Japanese soccer player
Tatsumi Kimishima, Japanese businessman for Nintendo
Tatsumi Kumashiro (1927–1995), Japanese film director
Tatsumi Nikamoto (born 1953), Japanese actor
Tatsumi Yoda (born 1940), Japanese businessman

Places
 Tatsumi, Tokyo a region in Koto Ward
 Tatsumi Station, a Tokyo Metro station
 Tatsumi Dam, a dam in Ishikawa Prefecture
 Kita-Tatsumi Station, a train station in Osaka
 Minami-Tatsumi Station, a metro station in Osaka
 Tokyo Tatsumi International Swimming Center, a swimming venue

Other
 Tatsumi (company), a manufacturer of electronics devices and video games
 Tatsumi family, a fictional family from the TV series Kyuukyuu Sentai GoGoFive
 Tatsumi (film), a film directed by Eric Khoo
 Tatsumi-ryū, a school of martial arts
 Tatsumi, a character from the manga series Akame ga Kill!

Japanese-language surnames
Japanese masculine given names